Julie Anne Legate is Professor in the Department of Linguistics at the University of Pennsylvania. She works in the areas of syntax and morphology. Her work investigates the structural representation of voice in syntax, beginning with a focus on Acehnese, a language spoken in Indonesia, but also including evidence from structures in Celtic, Scandinavian, and Slavic, broadening current cross-linguistic understanding of passive-like constructions.

Legate earned her B.A. from York University in 1995 and her M.A. from the University of Toronto in 1997. She received her Ph.D. from the Massachusetts Institute of Technology in 2002, writing a dissertation on the Warlpiri language, under the supervision of Noam Chomsky and Sabine Iatridou.

Since 2015 Legate has been the Editor-in-Chief of the journal Natural Language and Linguistic Theory.

Key publications

Articles and chapters 
JA Legate and CD Yang.  2002. Empirical re-assessment of stimulus poverty arguments. The Linguistic Review.

JA Legate. 2003. Some interface properties of the phase. Linguistic Inquiry.

JA Legate. 2006. Split absolutive. Ergativity.

JA Legate and CD Yang. 2007. Morphosyntactic learning and the development of tense. Language Acquisition.

JA Legate. 2008. Morphological and abstract case. Linguistic Inquiry.

JA Legate. 2012. Subjects in Acehnese and the Nature of the Passive. Language.

JA Legate, Faruk Akkus, Milena Sereikaite, Don Ringe. 2008. On Passives of Passives. Language.

Books 

JA Legate. 2014. Voice and v: Lessons from Acehnese (Linguistic Inquiry Monographs). MIT Press.

References

External links 
 Faculty page at the University of Pennsylvania. http://www.ling.upenn.edu/~jlegate/
 Video: Ehu International Workshop on Ergative Languages "Types of Ergativity" https://ehutb.ehu.es/video/58c66541f82b2b0f2e8b459a

Women linguists
Linguists from the United States
Living people
MIT School of Humanities, Arts, and Social Sciences alumni
University of Toronto alumni
University of Pennsylvania faculty
Year of birth missing (living people)